The Pertuis d'Antioche (Passage of Antioch) is a strait on the Atlantic coast of Western France, between two islands, Île de Ré and Oléron, on the one side, and on the other side the continental coast between the cities of La Rochelle and the naval arsenal of Rochefort.    The link with Antioch is tenuous: the Pertuis is a north-eastern corner of coastline, as is the coast between Cyprus, Syria and Turkey around the ancient city.

History
The Pertuis d'Antioche was already active during Roman times, when it saw trade in salt and wine centred on Saintes. Much later, the military rivalry between England and France resulted in the Pertuis being the site of frequent naval engagements.

In the middle-ages, the area sought its independence from the English crown under Richard the Lionheart. Louis XIV made the city of Rochefort one of the great naval bases of his kingdom. He then had fortresses constructed to protect the Rochefort roads. During the Napoleonic wars, the French further fortified the area, most notably with the construction of Fort Boyard. After his defeat at Waterloo, Napoleon tried to flee to the United States of America from the Pertuis d'Antioche, but eventually surrendered to the English navy, which was blockading the area; he was later sent into exile on the island of Saint Helena.

Lastly, during World War II, the Germans occupied the coast and fortified it against invasion. They also built a large submarine base in La Rochelle; this still stands today, and was used as a set for the historical submarine movie Das Boot. Even after the Allied invasion of France, La Rochelle remained a pocket of German resistance that surrendered only at the end of the war.

Geography
The Pertuis d'Antioche is bordered by a limestone coast dating back to the Cretaceous, at which time it was deep under water. The weather is oceanic. Although at the same latitude as Montreal, Canada and the Kuril islands, Russia, the area is quite warm throughout the year, due to the influence of the Gulf Stream waters, and the number of sunny days per year, which is remarkably high, on a par with the French Riviera on the Mediterranean coast of France. With its warm, protected waters, the Pertuis d'Antioche has become one of the most active tourist and pleasure-boat centres in Europe, with the La Rochelle marina complex at its centre.

Gallery

Further reading 
      An early modern pilotage handbook for what was at the time an enemy coast.  The description identifies the Pertuis as the strait between the sheltering islands - rather than as the stretch of coastal water in their lee.

Straits of Metropolitan France
Landforms of Charente-Maritime